The 1957 Gent–Wevelgem was the 19th edition of the Gent–Wevelgem cycle race and was held on 23 March 1957. The race started in Ghent and finished in Wevelgem. The race was won by Rik Van Looy.

General classification

References

Gent–Wevelgem
1957 in road cycling
1957 in Belgian sport
March 1957 sports events in Europe